John Crocker was a British Army officer.

John Crocker may also refer to:

John Crocker (jazz musician)
John Crocker (physicist)
John Crocker (MP for Tavistock), English MP for Tavistock (UK Parliament constituency), 1394
John Crocker (died 1508) (c. 1433–1508), English MP for Devon (UK Parliament constituency), 1491
John Crocker (actor) (1925–2015), English actor